Streetwalker (Spanish:Trotacalles) is a 1951 Mexican drama film directed by Matilde Landeta and starring Miroslava, Ernesto Alonso and Elda Peralta.

The film's sets were designed by Luis Moya.

Cast
 Miroslava as Elena  
 Ernesto Alonsoas Rodolfo  
 Elda Peralta as Maria; Azalea  
 Miguel Ángel Ferriz as Don Faustino Irigoyen 
 Aurora Izquierdo
 Enedina Díaz de León as Amiga anciana de Ruth  
 Juan Orraca as Cura  
 Adolfo Ramirez 
 Rogelio Fernández as Secuaz de Rodolfo  
 Salvador Godínez as Secuaz de Rodolfo  
 Isabela Corona as Ruth 
 Rodolfo Calvo as Embajador 
 Jorge Cobián
 Beatriz Jimeno as Amiga de Elena  
 Cecilia Leger as Esposa del embajador  
 Kika Meyer as Amiga de Elena  
 Diana Ochoa as Amiga de Ruth  
 Carlos Rincón Gallardo as Mesero  
 Wolf Ruvinskis as Carlos  
 Eduardo Solís as Cantante  
 Consuelo Vidal as Cantante  
 Enrique Zambrano as Médico

References

Bibliography 
 Dever, Susan. Celluloid Nationalism and Other Melodramas: From Post-Revolutionary Mexico to fin de siglo Mexamerica. SUNY Press, 2012.

External links 
 

1951 films
Mexican drama films
1951 drama films
1950s Spanish-language films
Mexican black-and-white films
1950s Mexican films